The sixth competition weekend of the 2008–09 ISU Speed Skating World Cup was a two-day event focusing on the shorter distances, held at the Kometa Ice Rink in Kolomna, Russia, from Saturday, 24 January, until Sunday, 25 January 2009.

Schedule of events
The schedule of the event is below.

Medal winners

Men's events

Women's events

References

6
Isu World Cup, 2008-09, 6
Sport in Kolomna